Lavinia Tananta is the defending champion of the Women's Singles competition of the 2011 Southeast Asian Games but lost to Anna Clarice Patrimonio in the quarterfinals. Ayu-Fani Damayanti won the title after beating top seed Noppawan Lertcheewakarn in the final by 6–4, 6–1.

Medalists

Draw

Seeds

All the four seeds received byes to the quarterfinals.

  Noppawan Lertcheewakarn (final)
  Ayu-Fani Damayanti (champion)
  Nicha Lertpitaksinchai (semifinals)
  Lavinia Tananta (quarterfinals)

Main draw

References
Draw
SEAG2011 Start/Result Lists - Tennis

Women's Singles